Girl from Nowhere (lit. New Girl) is a Thai mystery thriller anthology television series created by studio SOUR Bangkok and starring actress Chicha "Kitty" Amatayakul in the lead role.

The first season was released on August 8, 2018, on GMM 25. A second season was released globally on Netflix on May 7, 2021, which exposed the show to international fame. It has hit number one on the currently most watched Netflix shows in Thailand, Vietnam and the Philippines, while also ranking in the top 10 in countries around the world such as Brazil. The show has been critically acclaimed for the usage of unconventional storytelling and takes on modern high school society.

Premise 
The plot revolves around Nanno, an enigmatic girl who transfers to different private schools in Thailand and exposes the students and faculty's stories of lies, secrets, and hypocrisy. Nanno on occasion lies to provoke others. She is revealed to be an immortal entity, punishing wrongdoers for their crimes and misdeeds. In Season 2, Nanno meets her match in newfound rival Yuri, who has a different, more revenge focused ideology and wants to take over Nanno's duties.

Cast
 Chicha Amatayakul as Nanno, a girl with mysterious powers and an enigmatic origin. Nanno serves as a both guide and punisher to humans who hide secrets or want something without thinking of the consequences. Not much is known about her other than she is a teenager who doesn't age. Nanno is revealed to be an immortal entity that has the power to expose the lies and misdeeds of each faculty at every turn. Nanno is neither good nor evil in her crusade as she seems to punish everyone equally, and while she feels no regret towards hurting people she only hurts those who have harmed others. Nanno prefers taking her time and planning out the appropriate punishments to the tormentors and offenders before she ends her games. Nanno's outfit consists of her short medium-length, bowl-cut/bob hairstyle with bangs, female school uniform, and she is known for her evil inhuman-like cackle. She draws similarities to the Junji Ito manga character Tomie Kawakami which was credited as an inspiration for the role, according to Amatayakul.
 Chanya McClory (season 2) as Yuri, Nanno's rival. In episode four, Yuri was originally a victim Nanno attempted to help after she was mistreated by two rich girls who blackmailed students, including Yuri, with sex tapes of the students being raped. However, it is revealed that Yuri had already planned for revenge on the girls since her assault, and instead of listening to Nanno's advice she instead tried to put her own revenge plan into focus. Yuri's plan backfires when the men she hired to assault the girls kill Yuri as well, drowning her in the tub that a bleeding Nanno was later placed in. Nanno's blood revived Yuri, which gave her the same powers and immortality as her. However, unlike Nanno, Yuri prefers revenge by killing her victims or causing chaos instead of teaching them a lesson. Yuri appears to be very manipulative and seems to have no remorse for any of her actions. Similarly to Nanno, Yuri's outfit is a traditional female school uniform, with her hair tied in a ponytail using a signature red ribbon.

Episodes

Season 1 (2018)
Each episode consists of individual stories and the appearance of Nanno at different schools.

Season 2 (2021)
Nanno is joined by a schoolgirl named Yuri, who becomes immortal after meeting Nanno.

Conception and development 
The storylines in the episodes are inspired by actual real news reports where schoolgirls were victimized, but with the intent of showing how the victims will ultimately become the victor. For instance, "Minnie and the Four Bodies" was based on an incident where a student had run into a university van killing nine people, and had avoided the consequences because of her family's wealthy connections.

"SOTUS" was also based on an incident where a senior punishes a junior for failing to follow the hazing rules, resulting in homicide.

Lead actress Amatayakul used "Tomie", a Japanese horror manga featuring a succubus-like woman, as her reference for the series.

Days before auditioning for the role of Yuri, Chanya McClory had just started recovery for having an operation for removing a brain tumor. Her determination to get the role won over the casting crew and inspired her to empower her character.

Release

The first season of Girl From Nowhere was released on August 8, 2018, on GMM 25. It was also released on Netflix on October 31, 2018.

On April 19, 2021, a trailer was released for the second season.

Season 2 has 8 episodes and was released on May 7, 2021, on Netflix.

Awards and nominations

References

External links

 
 

2018 Thai television series debuts
2010s Thai television series
2020s Thai television series
GMM 25 original programming
Thai-language Netflix original programming
Television series about revenge